Pasaje Jacaranda, officially Plaza Comercial Plaza Jacaranda, designed by architects Ramón Torres Martínez and Héctor Velázquez Moreno, was an open-air shopping center opened in 1959 in the Zona Rosa, Mexico City, at the time considered the hippest and most cosmopolitan district of the city. Artists such as Carlos Monsivais, José Luis Cuevas and Alejandro Jodorowsky frequented the plaza. Its shops and art galleries had full-width, full-height glass windows facing an interior courtyard. It was located on the east side of Genova Street between Londres and Liverpool streets. Then-famous restaurants such as Le Bistrot and Alfredo's, as well as La Trucha Vagabunda, Toulouse-Lautrec, and La Cabaña  were located in Pasaje Jacaranda, as was the jewelry shop of jeweler and sculptor Ernesto Paulsen. As the neighborhood deteriorated in the 1980s and particularly as a result of the 1985 Mexico City earthquake, different buildings of the complex were torn down. Kentucky Fried Chicken, music and computer stores, and other shops and restaurants are located on the site today.

External links
Photo of Pasaje Jacaranda, 1968

References

Shopping malls in Greater Mexico City
Defunct shopping malls
Cuauhtémoc, Mexico City
Shopping malls established in 1959